Michel Thierry (24 July 1928 – 7 December 2021) was a French industrialist in the textile sector.

Biography
Initially specializing in fabrics for clothing and upholstery, the Société Michel Thierry began producing textiles for automotive equipment, becoming one of the European leaders in the sector and the largest employer in Ariège. The company was sold off in the 2000s, although the original textile plant is still in operation, owned by Asahi Kasei as of 2021.

During his time as a business owner, Thierry helped finance the  resort and presided over the  rugby team. He was the father of Laurent Thierry, head of the company .

Thierry died in Dax on 7 December 2021, at the age of 93.

References

1928 births
2021 deaths
French industrialists
People from Agen